Beatrice  is a town in Monroe County, Alabama, United States. It incorporated in 1901. At the 2020 census the population was 204, down from 301 in 2010 and 412 in 2000.

Geography
Beatrice is located in northern Monroe County at  (31.733178, -87.206773). Alabama State Routes 21 and 47 pass through the town. Together they lead southwest  to Monroeville, the county seat, and east  to Riley. State Route 265 leads north from Beatrice  to Camden.

Demographics

As of the census of 2000, there were 412 people, 158 households, and 106 families residing in the town. The racial makeup of the town was 26.94% White, 72.57% Black or African American, 0.24% Native American and 0.24% Pacific Islander. 0.49% of the population were Hispanic or Latino of any race.

There were 158 households, out of which 32.9% had children under the age of 18 living with them, 36.1% were married couples living together, 25.3% had a female householder with no husband present, and 32.3% were non-families. 29.7% of all households were made up of individuals, and 18.4% had someone living alone who was 65 years of age or older. The average household size was 2.61 and the average family size was 3.17.

In the town, the population was spread out, with 28.9% under the age of 18, 9.7% from 18 to 24, 20.6% from 25 to 44, 21.4% from 45 to 64, and 19.4% who were 65 years of age or older. The median age was 38 years. For every 100 females, there were 89.0 males. For every 100 females age 18 and over, there were 84.3 males.

The median income for a household in the town was $15,833, and the median income for a family was $15,625. Males had a median income of $30,417 versus $15,469 for females. The per capita income for the town was $8,661. About 39.6% of families and 44.4% of the population were below the poverty line, including 54.5% of those under age 18 and 29.2% of those age 65 or over.

Education 
Beatrice has one school local to the town region, J.F. Shields High School. The school has approximately 260 students, living in Beatrice and other nearby towns. The school maintains a Student-Teacher ratio of 15:1, rating in the top 20% of the Alabama state. The school marks with the ACT test.

Notable people
Butch Avinger, former NFL player
John Drew, former NBA player (Atlanta Hawks), graduate of J. F. Shields
Thad McClammy, politician

References

External links
Coastal Gateway Regional Economic Development Alliance

Towns in Monroe County, Alabama
Towns in Alabama